The Biz is an album by the American band the Sea and Cake, released in 1995. It was recorded at John McEntire's studio.

Critical reception

Trouser Press stated: "Where most of Prekop's previous output shuffles, The Biz meanders; dynamic grooves give way to lazy jamming, hooks are outnumbered by pointless riffing and some of the mellower material would be right at home on a lite-rock radio station." The Chicago Tribune called the album "a stunning amalgam of infectious hooks and thoughtful experimentation."

AllMusic wrote: "A less structured record than previous efforts, The Biz is also the Sea and Cake's most subdued: songs like the title track, 'Station in the Valley' and 'Sending' are loose and languid, favoring a more jam-oriented and subconscious vibe over the taut dynamics of earlier work." Paste listed it as the 20th best indie rock album of 1995.

Track listing
 "The Biz" – 4:01
 "Leeora" – 4:23
 "The Kiss" – 3:46
 "Station in the Valley" – 4:54
 "Darkest Night" – 3:49
 "Sending" – 2:29
 "Escort" – 4:28
 "An Assassin" – 3:07
 "The Transaction" – 3:33
 "For Minor Sky" – 3:33

Personnel
Sam Prekop – vocals, guitar
Archer Prewitt – guitar, organ, vibes
Eric Claridge – bass
John McEntire – drums, electric piano, organ, vibes

References

The Sea and Cake albums
1995 albums
Thrill Jockey albums